Chilliwack-Kent is a provincial electoral district for the Legislative Assembly of British Columbia, Canada that first existed from 2001 to 2009, when it was replaced by the Chilliwack-Hope riding. In the 2015 redistribution, the eastern portion of Chilliwack-Hope was adjusted and the name Chilliwack-Kent was brought back into service and was contested in the 2017 general election.

Demographics

Geography

1999 Redistribution
Changes from Chilliwack to Chilliwack-Kent include:

History

Member of Legislative Assembly 
As of the 2020 election, its MLA is Kelli Paddon, replacing Laurie Throness, who was first elected to represent the Chilliwack-Hope riding in 2013. From 2001 to 2009, Chilliwack-Kent was represented by Barry Penner.

Election results

2009-2017, Riding dissolved into Chilliwack-Hope 

|-

|-
 
|NDP
|Malcolm James
|align="right"|2,155
|align="right"|11.68%
|align="right"|
|align="right"|$3,979

External links 
BC Stats - 2001 (pdf
Results of 2001 election (pdf)
2001 Expenditures (pdf)
Website of the Legislative Assembly of British Columbia

References

Former provincial electoral districts of British Columbia
Politics of Chilliwack